Richard Sedláček (born 21 June 1999) is a Czech professional footballer who plays as midfielder for Eerste Divisie club VVV-Venlo.

Club career

AZ
Sedláček played in the Sparta Prague youth academy until 2018, where he moved to Dutch club AZ, initially joining the reserve team Jong AZ competing in the second-tier Eerste Divisie. He made his league debut for Jong AZ on 5 October 2018, replacing Tijjani Reijnders in the 73rd minute in a 2–2 home draw against Helmond Sport.

VVV-Venlo
On 31 January 2022, Sedláček signed a one-and-a-half-year contract with Eerste Divisie club VVV-Venlo, joining the club alongside Jong AZ teammate Sem Dirks. He made his debut on 4 February 2022, starting in a 5–0 away win over MVV in the Eerste Divisie. Exactly one month later, on 4 March, Sedláček was forced off due to an injury after ten minutes of play in the league game against Volendam; it was later confirmed how he would miss the remainder of the 2021–22 season, as he had "torn his ankle ligament".

Career statistics

References

External links
 

1999 births
Living people
Czech footballers
Czech Republic youth international footballers
Association football midfielders
Eerste Divisie players
AC Sparta Prague players
Jong AZ players
VVV-Venlo players
People from Rumburk
Czech expatriate footballers
Expatriate footballers in the Netherlands
Czech expatriate sportspeople in the Netherlands
Sportspeople from the Ústí nad Labem Region